Ferario Spasov (Bulgarian: Ферарио Спасов; born 20 February 1962 in Dupnitsa) is a Bulgarian football coach.

Managerial career

He has been manager of Litex Lovech and CSKA Sofia.

From 1 April 2016 he became the manager of Etar Veliko Tarnovo after Boncho Genchev secured the position of chairman of the zonal council of BFU in Veliko Tarnovo.

On 26 October 2016, Spasov was appointed as manager of Beroe but his contract was terminated by mutual consent after the final game of the season.

On 28 August 2017, Spasov was appointed as manager of Montana.

On 8 October 2019, Spasov replaced Željko Petrović as a manager of Botev Plovdiv.

Honours

Managerial honours
Litex Lovech
 Bulgarian A Group: 1998–99
 Bulgarian Cup: 2000–01

References

1962 births
Living people
Bulgarian footballers
Bulgarian football managers
People from Dupnitsa
PFC CSKA Sofia managers
PFC Litex Lovech managers
PFC Spartak Varna managers
Botev Plovdiv managers
FC Montana managers
PFC Beroe Stara Zagora managers
Association football forwards
Sportspeople from Kyustendil Province